The 2020 Korean Tour was the tenth season of the Korean Tour to carry Official World Golf Ranking points. The season consisted of 11 official events. All the tournaments had prize funds of at least 500 million won (approximately US$500,000). Six had prize funds of 1 billion won ($1,000,000) or more.

Schedule
The following table lists official events during the 2020 season.

Order of Merit
The Order of Merit was titled as the Genesis Points and was based on prize money won during the season, calculated using a points-based system. The leading player on the tour (not otherwise exempt) earned status to play on the 2021 European Tour.

Notes

References

External links

2020 Korean Tour
2020 in golf
2020 in South Korean sport